Nicolás Kanellos (born January 31, 1945, in New York City, New York) is founder and director of Arte Público Press, the oldest and largest Hispanic publishing house, as well as Revista Chicana-Riqueña, the first Hispanic literary magazine which later became The Amerícas Review. He is the Brown Foundation professor of Hispanic studies at the University of Houston.

Biography
Nicolás Kanellos was born on January 31, 1945, in New York City, New York, to Puerto Rican and Greek parents. He grew up in Jersey City, New Jersey, near a commercial book bindery. His aunt, Providencia Garcia, developed the Latin division of one of the largest Latin music publishers in the world, and was a significant influence on him.

Kanellos earned a B.A. in Spanish literature in 1966 from Fairleigh Dickinson University and an M.A. in Romance languages from UT Austin in 1968 before earning his doctorate in 1974 in Austin as well. He taught Hispanic literature at Indiana University from 1971 until 1979, when he began teaching at the University of Houston and founded Arte Publico Press. Since its founding Arte Público Press has published over 600 books. While in Indiana he founded Revista Chicana-Riqueña with Luis Davila in 1972.

Awards
 2016, Cruz de la Orden de Isabel la Católica
2014, Enrique Anderson Imbert, North American Academy of the Spanish Language
1996, Denali Press Award, American Library Association
1989, American Book Award (publisher-editor)
 1988, White House Hispanic Heritage Award for Literature
 1986–1987, Ford Foundation Fellow
1979, Coordinating Council of Literary Magazines
1979, National Endowment for the Humanities Fellow
 1976, Eli Lilly Foundation Fellow
 1969–1970, Gulbenkian Foundation Fellow

Selected publications
 Kanellos, Nicolás (2011). Hispanic Immigrant Literature: El Sueño del Retorno, University of Texas Press, 
 Kanellos, Nicolás (2001). Herencia: The Anthology of Hispanic Literature of the United States, Oxford University Press, 
 Kanellos, Nicolás (1999). Nochebuena: Hispanic American Christmas Stories, Oxford University Press,

References 

21st-century American businesspeople
American book publishing company founders
Businesspeople from New York City
Businesspeople from Houston
1945 births
Living people
People from Jersey City, New Jersey
University of Texas at Austin College of Liberal Arts alumni
Fairleigh Dickinson University alumni
American people of Greek descent
Indiana University faculty
University of Houston faculty
21st-century publishers (people)
20th-century publishers (people)
20th-century American businesspeople
American Hispanists
American people of Puerto Rican descent